Acrolepiopsis clavivalvatella is a moth of the family Acrolepiidae. It was described by Sigeru Moriuti in 1972. It is found in Japan.

The wingspan is 9.5-11.5 mm.

References

Moths described in 1972
Acrolepiidae
Moths of Japan